Bukit Lawang is a small tourist village on the bank of Bahorok River in North Sumatra province of Indonesia. Situated approximately 86 km northwest of the city of Medan, Bukit Lawang is known for the largest animal sanctuary of Sumatran orangutan (around 5,000 orangutans occupying the area) and also the main access point to the Gunung Leuser National Park from the east side.

The Bukit Lawang rehabilitation centre for orangutans was founded in 1973. Its main purpose was to preserve the decreasing number of orangutan population due to hunting, trading and deforestation. The centre closed in 2002 as the place was getting too touristy and unsuitable for animal rehabilitation.

A flash flood hit Bukit Lawang on 2 November 2003. The disaster destroyed the local tourist resorts and had a devastating impact to the local tourism industry in the area. Around 400 houses, 3 mosques, 8 bridges, 280 kiosks and food stalls, 35 hotels and guest houses were destroyed by the flood; 239 people including 5 tourists were killed, and around 1,400 locals lost their homes. Local authorities and an environmental NGO attributed it to illegal logging. Thanks to several international cooperation agencies, the site was rebuilt and re-opened again in July 2004. The area is slowly regenerating and offers truly wonderful escapes and the chance to see an abundance of wildlife.

References

External links

 
 

Populated places in North Sumatra
Primate sanctuaries